Savva Lika (born 27 June 1970) is a Greek retired javelin thrower.

Life and athletic competitions
Savva Lika was born Vojsava Lika in Krujë District, Albania, the daughter of ethnic Albanian parents. She is of the Albanian Orthodox faith. She represented Albania prior to 2002. On October 11, 1987, under trained from coach Enver Mysja at only 17, she became champion of Albania and set a new national record of javelin throw with 53.30m.

She migrated to Greece in 1997.

Her personal best throw is 63.13 metres, achieved at the 2007 World Championships, August 2007 in Osaka, Japan in which she took the 5th place.

She retired after the Hellenic Championship in 2014.

Honours

References

External links
 

1970 births
Living people
Greek female javelin throwers
Albanian female javelin throwers
Albanian javelin throwers
Albanian emigrants to Greece
Athletes (track and field) at the 2004 Summer Olympics
Athletes (track and field) at the 2008 Summer Olympics
Athletes (track and field) at the 2012 Summer Olympics
Olympic athletes of Greece
People from Krujë
Naturalized citizens of Greece
Members of the Albanian Orthodox Church
Eastern Orthodox Christians from Albania
Greek people of Albanian descent
Mediterranean Games gold medalists for Greece
Mediterranean Games medalists in athletics
Athletes (track and field) at the 2009 Mediterranean Games
21st-century Greek women
21st-century Albanian women